Heather Dorothy Stefanson  (born May 11, 1970) is a Canadian politician who has served as the 24th premier of Manitoba since November 2, 2021. She is the leader of the Progressive Conservative Party of Manitoba and sits as a member of the Legislative Assembly (MLA), representing the electoral district of Tuxedo.

Early life and career

Heather Dorothy Stefanson was born on May 11, 1970, in Winnipeg, Manitoba. She was raised in Winnipeg, where she attended St. John's-Ravenscourt School. She received a Bachelor of Arts in political science from the University of Western Ontario.

After receiving her degree, Stefanson worked as a special assistant in the Office of the Prime Minister under Brian Mulroney before returning to Manitoba in 1993 as an assistant to federal Agriculture Minister Charlie Mayer.

In 1999, Stefanson was suspended for seven months by the Manitoba district council of the Investment Dealers Association of Canada for failing to meet educational requirements. Stefanson was found to have made 34 inappropriate trades while she was working as an investment adviser at Wellington West Capital.  In 2003, Wellington West Capital was fined $13,000 for failing to supervise the activities of Stefanson. She had been suspended from acting in the capacity of a registered representative but had issued statements to clients indicating her employment as a registered representative during this suspension. From 1995 to 2000, Stefanson was a member of the University of Manitoba's Young Associates organization.

Political career

Stefanson was first elected to the Manitoba legislature in a 2000 by-election, replacing former Progressive Conservative Premier Gary Filmon in the south Winnipeg riding of Tuxedo. Stefanson defeated Liberal Rochelle Zimberg by 2692 votes to 1586; Iona Starr, representing the governing New Democratic Party (NDP), finished third. Stefanson was easily re-elected in the 2003 election, with the NDP improving to a second-place status. She was re-elected in the 2007, 2011, 2016, and 2019 elections.

In 2016, Premier Brian Pallister named Stefanson deputy premier and the minister of justice and attorney general. In 2018, she became the minister of families in addition to her role as deputy premier. In 2021, she took over the health portfolio; health minister Kelvin Goertzen became deputy premier.

During Manitoba's third-wave of Covid-19 Stefanson claimed on May 18, 2021 that Manitoba's health system could handle an additional 50 patients in the ICU for a total of 170. However, later that day, she announced ICU beds were at capacity and two patients had been sent to Thunder Bay for treatment.  Shared Health had been aware that the healthcare system was unable to handle 170 patients, and on May 7, chief nursing officer Lanette Siragusa called a previous exercise showing capacity at 173 ICU beds a “paper exercise” that "did not reflect the reality of Manitoba’s capacity". On May 13, Shared Health CEO Adam Topp attended a meeting regarding  Thunder Bay Regional Health Sciences Centre and ICU capacity. However, Stefanson claims she was not aware of this meeting, and didn't know about the out-of-province transfer until after the decision was made.  In total, Manitoba transferred 57 Covid-19 patients out of the province during the third wave, 12 of whom died while being treated out of province.

MLA for Tuxedo 
As MLA for Tuxedo, Stefanson has been an advocate for Special Olympics Manitoba,an organization dedicated to enriching the lives of people with intellectual disabilities through sport. In 2013, she introduced The Special Olympics Awareness Week Act in the Manitoba Legislative Assembly, designating the second week of June each year as Special Olympics Awareness Week in Manitoba. The Act received unanimous support from the Manitoba Legislative Assembly.  Stefanson also continues to serve as an honourary board member for Special Olympics Manitoba.

Stefanson has announced several investments in the Assiniboine Park located in her Tuxedo constituency. In 2017 when Stefanson was serving as Deputy Premier,  she announced $15 million for the Assiniboine Park Conservancy’s new Diversity Gardens project, the final phase of the Conservancy’s 10-year, $200 million development plan.  As Premier in 2022, Stefanson announced $2 million to support a $15 million capital campaign to build the new Toba Centre for Children & Youth at 710 Assiniboine Park Drive. The Toba Centre for Children & Youth provides support to child abuse victims, including forensic interviews. Stefanson has maintained strong ties with the Jewish community throughout her time as MLA. In 2016, she condemned rising anti-Semitism and praised the Tuxedo Jewish community.  In 2019, she joined Winnipeg Mayor Brian Bowman in requesting that the Social Planning Council of Winnipeg disinvite controversial American activist Linda Sarsour from speaking at an event, citing the speaker’s anti-Semitic comments.

Minister of Justice and Attorney General 
Stefanson was sworn in as Minister of Justice and Attorney General in a ceremony at the Canadian Museum of Human Rights in 2016, becoming only the second woman to hold that position since 1871. She was also appointed Deputy Premier and Keeper of the Great Seal of the Province of Manitoba.

In response to a 2016 report by the MacDonald-Laurier Institute that ranked Manitoba’s criminal justice system as the worst in the country, Stefanson committed to a full review of the criminal justice system.  The review showed that Manitoba had the highest adult incarceration rate among provinces, along with high violent crime and recidivism rates. The review also found significant delay in criminal matters moving through Manitoba’s court system. To respond to the review, Stefanson released Manitoba’s Criminal Justice System Modernization Strategy in March 2018. The plan included four essential components, including crime prevention; focusing resources on the most serious criminal cases; more effectively using restorative justice; and responsibly reintegrating offenders back into society. In 2019, Stefanson’s successor as Minister of Justice announced that the strategy had resulted in significant reductions in time to disposition in Manitoba’s provincial court and Court of Queen’s Bench as well as a reduction in provincial custody counts.

In 2017, Stefanson collaborated with the Chief Justices of Manitoba’s provincial court, Court of Queen’s Bench, and Court of Appeal to request that the federal government change the Criminal Code to eliminate preliminary inquiries in the province. The letter proposed a four-year pilot project where preliminary inquiries would be eliminated for indictable offences carrying a sentence less than 10 years, and replaced with an out of court discovery process for offences carrying a sentence over 10 years. The goal of the proposed project was to reduce unreasonable court delays. It responded to the Supreme Court of Canada’s decision in R v. Jordan, which set time limits on criminal proceedings that could result in people accused of serious crimes, including murder, walking free due to unreasonable court delay. The federal government responded to calls for preliminary inquiry reform in 2018 with the introduction and passage of Bill C-75. The Bill restricts preliminary inquiries to only offences carrying a maximum sentence of 14 years or more. University of Ottawa law professor Allan Rock estimated the legislation would produce an 87 percent reduction in preliminary inquiries and help reduce court delay significantly. In a statement regarding the Federal, Provincial and Territorial Justice Ministers meeting in April 2017, Stefanson expressed her support for mandatory minimum sentences for certain criminal offences.  She stated, “anything less than a prison sentence for certain crimes is unjustifiable in Manitoba’s view.” 

To prepare for the planned federal legalization of cannabis, Stefanson introduced The Cannabis Harm Prevention Act in March 2017. The Act created new cannabis related driving offences that anticipated the eventual legalization of the drug, including granting police the ability to issue 24-hour driver’s license suspensions if they believe a driver is under the influence of a drug or unable to safely operate a motor vehicle. In response to questions about the 2017 "420" protest on the Manitoba Legislature grounds, Stefanson stressed her concerns about the impact of cannabis on young people, saying of the protest “it does disturb me how many young people were out there today.” 

In December 2017, Stefanson introduced The Safe and Responsible Retailing of Cannabis Act, which established the framework for the regulation of cannabis retail sales in Manitoba. The Act established a private retail model, with retail licenses obtained from the newly renamed Liquor, Gaming and Cannabis Authority. It required that all retailers source their cannabis supply from Manitoba Liquor and Lotteries. The Act also established 19 as the legal age to purchase cannabis in Manitoba, a decision endorsed by the Manitoba School Boards Association, as it would help keep cannabis out of schools and playgrounds. 

Despite federal legislation allowing Canadian adults to grow up to four cannabis plants at home, he Safe and Responsible Retailing of Cannabis Act prohibited individuals from home cultivation of cannabis. Manitoba and Quebec are the only provinces to prohibit home cultivation of cannabis. Stefanson defended the home grow prohibition as a means of keeping cannabis away from children and preventing diversion of supply into the black market. The Canadian Association of Chiefs of Police had joined Stefanson and other Justice Ministers in calling for a national prohibition of home cultivation in April 2017.  Cannabis advocates have since challenged both the Manitoba and Quebec home cultivation prohibitions in court as unconstitutional.

In March 2018, Stefanson announced The Impaired Driving Offences Act, which updated drug impaired driving provisions to complement pending federal legislation. Included in the Act were new administrative driver’s license suspensions for impaired driving. She was joined by the Minister of Health, Seniors and Active Living who announced a provincial prohibition on smoking cannabis in outdoor public places.

In October 2017, Stefanson established a committee of experts in family law to make recommendations on how to make the system more accessible and less adversarial for couples going through separation and divorce. In June 2018, Stefanson announced the committee’s recommendations, which included establishing a three year pilot project in Winnipeg to direct Winnipeg-based family matters to non-adversarial mediation outside of court; creating an administrative office to triage and find more appropriate ways to resolve disputes; and expanding information available to Manitobans about family law related issues. In March 2019, Stefanson’s successor as Minister of Justice introduced The Family Law Modernization Act based on the findings of the committee. The law included changes that would allow separating couples to resolve child custody, support, and property matters without going to court. The provincial government eventually launched a Family Resolution Service to resolve matters earlier and outside the tradition court process.The government estimated the new service would save Manitoba families up to $41 million in court and legal fees.

In March 2018, Stefanson introduced legislation reinstating the Queen’s Counsel designation for Manitoba lawyers who have served for at least 10 years and have demonstrated outstanding practice as a lawyer among other contributions. In October 2018, Stefanson’s predecessor issued the first call for nominations for Queen’s Counsel appointments. In June 2019, the Minister of Justice made the first Queen’s Counsel appointments since the practice ended under the former NDP government in 2001.

Premier of Manitoba

After Pallister announced his impending retirement, Stefanson announced that she would run in the 2021 Progressive Conservative Party of Manitoba leadership election. She was the first PC party member to announce their candidacy in the election, and had the support of two thirds of the PC caucus. Pallister resigned on September 1, and Goertzen took over as premier pending the election of his successor.

Stefanson narrowly won the race with 363 votes over her opponent, Shelly Glover. Stefanson was sworn in as Manitoba's first female premier on November 2, 2021, with Goertzen as her deputy. On March 21, Stefanson released her leadership campaign financials revealing that she raised $576,625 in campaign donations, $360,000 of that money came from 120 individuals who donated the maximum amount of $3,000. On May 14, 2022, Stefanson was cautioned for having illegally spent $1,800 in campaign funds prior to the electoral period beginning. Malaya Marcelino, an NDP MLA pointed out this is not the first time Stefanson has flouted rules referencing the $31 Million dollars in real estate sales Stefanson neglected to disclose.

On January 27, 2022, Stefanson admitted to breaking conflict of interest rules when she failed to disclose over 31 million dollars in property sales.  As an MLA, Stefanson had listed these properties among her assets, but then stopped when the properties sold and she did not file all required paperwork, but had met with the conflict of interest commissioner.

On March 15, Stefanson received widespread criticism for responding to Wab Kinew's question about Krystal Mousseau, an ICU patient who died during a failed transfer to a hospital out of Manitoba with a boast about her son's performance at a hockey game.  Two days later Stefanson issued a brief written apology.  The NDP has been calling for an inquiry into circumstances of the death citing a letter from the regional health authority released a letter explaining that the transfer team was lacking critical monitoring equipment and training. Additionally, the patient was being given medication at the wrong rate. On March 22, Stefanson admitted during a radio interview that she had not reached out to Mousseau's family to offer an apology or condolences.

Stefanson was criticized for making excuses for the out-of-province transfers saying "Manitoba was no exception, this is what’s happening across the country.", however Saskatchewan and Manitoba were the only provinces that transferred ICU patients out of the province. On April 6, Dan Roberts, a critical care physician and professor of medicine at the University of Manitoba, called on the government to open an inquiry into Krystal Mousseau's death.  He also criticized the Manitoba Progressive Conservative Party for "privatizing and dismantling" much of Manitoba's Air Ambulance Service in 2017 a change that was criticized by physicians who warned this move would compromise patient safety.

Stefanson's absence from the Royal Manitoba Winter Fair, one of the largest agricultural events in Western Canada, was criticized by many who noted that she consistently is ranked as the most unpopular premier in Canada.  Stefanson's reason given for missing the fair was she was on vacation with her son for spring break. Kelly Saunders, a professor at Brandon University, said she couldn't remember any other premier skipping the event in over 20 years, noting that it was surprising for the premier to miss this important agricultural event in Manitoba's second largest city.

Stefanson has been accused of repeatedly missing question period to attend press conferences instead.  Nahanni Fontaine said Stefanson's refusal to participate in question period prevented MLAs from doing their jobs.  Liberal MLA Jon Gerrard noted that these absences may contribute to further erosion of trust in the provincial government. These claims of a violation of member's privilege  were later dismissed by the Speaker of the Legislature. Comparison to the attendance record of previous Premier's shows a similar rate of attendance.

On May 3, 2022 Saskatchewan announced that their provincial minimum wage would rise to $13, effective October 1, 2022. This would make Manitoba's the lowest in Canada. On May 27, 2022, Stefanson's government introduced legislation to increase the minimum wage which was tied to the rate of inflation by legislation. On August 18, 2022 Stefanson announced the minimum wage would rise to $13.50 by October 1, 2022 and to $14.15 on April 1st, 2023. In addition to this, the inflationary increase previously legislated is forecast to have Manitoba's minimum wage above $15 an hour by October 2023. Despite being the largest single minimum wage increase in Manitoba history this was criticized by advocates as being not enough given increasing inflation and increasing cost of living. The Centre for Policy Alternatives released a report that suggests a living wage for a family of four with two working parents in Winnipeg is 18.34 per hour, far below the current minimum wage in Manitoba.

On June 9, 2022, Pride Winnipeg criticized Stefanson for using Pride as a photo-op when she neglected to march in the parade after promising to do so three separate times. When questioned, Stefanson blamed this on scheduling conflicts and miscommunication from her staff.  Last year the Premier, Brian Pallister, also promised to march in the parade after giving a speech.  After breaking this promise, Pride Winnipeg then implemented a policy that invited speakers must also march in the parade. In response, Pride Winnipeg stated that they would not be extending an invitation to Stefanson to speak at any 2023 pride events.

Stefanson is credited with dramatically improving relationships with other levels of government, which Federal officials and Winnipeg Mayor Brian Bowman have remarked to media. This comes as Stefanson has continued to work with other First Minister's to pressure the Federal Government to restore it's share of the Canada Health Transfer.

On Tuesday October 18, concerns were raised when it was discovered that Stefanson had used an undisclosed secret email for government communication.  In a freedom of information request it was revealed that on February 11 Stefanson privately pleaded for help from the Federal government amidst border blockades, asking for "immediate and effective" action and "national leadership that only you and the federal government can provide".  A few days later Stefanson would publicly claim that the situation was under control, and called on the government to refrain from using the Emergencies Act.

Electoral results

References

1970 births
Living people
Members of the Executive Council of Manitoba
Politicians from Winnipeg
Progressive Conservative Party of Manitoba MLAs
University of Western Ontario alumni
Women MLAs in Manitoba
21st-century Canadian politicians
21st-century Canadian women politicians
Women government ministers of Canada
Deputy premiers of Manitoba
Premiers of Manitoba
Health ministers of Manitoba
Female Canadian political party leaders
Canadian female first ministers